Ahangama Withanage Oswin Nandimithra Abeyagoonasekera (known as Ossie Abeygunasekera) was a Member of Parliament and chairman and the leader of the Sri Lanka Mahajana Pakshaya or Party. He was assassinated by a female suicide bomber of the Liberation Tigers of Tamil Eelam (LTTE) while attending an election rally in support of Gamini Dissanayake, for the Presidential election of 1994. He was an alumnus of Ananda College, St.Benedict's College Colombo.

He was arrested as a Naxalite Prisoner in 1982 along with Vijaya Kumaratunga for printing the "Rice ration book". In 1986, he negotiated with the LTTE for a peaceful solution for the ethnic conflict and for the release of the Sri Lankan soldiers who was captured. After the death of his close friend Vijaya Kumaratunga, founder of the Sri Lanka Mahajana Party, he became the leader in 1988 until his death in 1994. He contested the Presidential election in 1989, creating the United Socialist Alliance(USA). During the 1989 youth insurrection in Sri Lanka, there were several failed assassination attempts to his life. His political party lost the most members, 114 lives , during the  insurrection. He was an excellent orator and a visionary political leader. In 1994 he was elected to parliament under the United National Party ticket. 

Ossie Abeyagunasekera's father, A. W. A. Abeyagunasekera, was also a politician, member of the Colombo Municipal Council and the Chairman of Sri Lanka Ports Authority. A.W.A. Abeyagunasekera defeated in the Kelaniya by R. S. Perera in the 1960s. A. W. A. Abeyagunasekera died in the Air India Flight 855 crash in Mumbai.

Ossie Abeyagunasekera was married with one child, Asanga Abeyagoonasekera, who was the founding Director General of the Institute of National Security Studies Sri Lanka.

See also
Vijaya Kumaranatunga

References

External links
The 2nd landing of parachute
My father Ossie by Asanga Abeyagoonasekera
ඔසී යනු මේ රටේ කම්කරු පංති ව්‍යාපාරයේ දැවැන්ත පිබිදීමක් තුලින් බිහි වූ අපේක්ෂකයෙකි

1950 births
1994 deaths
Assassinated Sri Lankan politicians
Members of the 10th Parliament of Sri Lanka
Candidates in the 1988 Sri Lankan presidential election
People killed during the Sri Lankan Civil War
Sinhalese politicians
Sri Lanka Mahajana Pakshaya politicians
Sri Lankan Buddhists
Suicide bombings in Sri Lanka
Terrorist incidents in Sri Lanka in 1994
United National Party politicians